Neverita josephinia is a species of predatory sea snail, a marine gastropod mollusk in the family Naticidae, the moon shells.

This is the type species of the genus Neverita.

The fossil record of this species dates back to the Oligocene (age range: 23.03 to 0.012 million years ago). These fossils have been found in Hungary, Germany, Greece, Italy, Slovakia, Spain and Morocco.

Distribution
This is a Mediterranean species.

Description
Like other species in this genus, this snail has a corneous operculum.

References

External links

 Images of shells of Neverita josephinia

Naticidae
Gastropods described in 1826